The 5th Politburo of the Chinese Communist Party was elected by the 5th Central Committee of the Chinese Communist Party in Wuhan in 1927.

From this session forward, the CCP Central Bureau was renamed to CCP Politburo.  It was preceded by the 4th Central Bureau of the Chinese Communist Party.

Standing Committee Members
Ordered in political position ranking
Chen Duxiu
Zhang Guotao
Cai Hesen

Members
Ordered in political position ranking
Chen Duxiu
Cai Hesen
Li Weihan
Qu Qiubai
Zhang Guotao
Tan Pingshan
Li Lisan
Zhou Enlai

Alternate Members
Su Zhaozheng
Zhang Tailei

External links 
  Leaders of the 5th CCP Central Committee

Politburo of the Chinese Communist Party
1927 establishments in China